Walter Aiken Lewis (July 17, 1885 – May 29, 1956) was a Canadian rower who competed in the 1908 Summer Olympics. He was a crew member of the Canadian boat, which won the bronze medal in the men's eight.

References

External links
Walter Lewis profile

1885 births
1956 deaths
Canadian male rowers
Olympic rowers of Canada
Rowers at the 1908 Summer Olympics
Olympic bronze medalists for Canada
Olympic medalists in rowing
Medalists at the 1908 Summer Olympics
20th-century Canadian people